The 2016 Overwatch World Cup was the inaugural Overwatch World Cup, an annual Overwatch esports tournament, organized by Blizzard Entertainment, the game's developer. It was the first of the series, and the final tournament took place at BlizzCon at the Anaheim Convention Center from November 4–5, 2016.

The final took place on November 5 between South Korea and Russia. South Korea won 4–0 to win the first World Cup title.

Teams

Players 
Blizzard selected the top players from Season One of competitive play of Overwatch to possibly represent their country as a team member. Players with an Overwatch account and a region-specified Battle.net account then voted on who they would like to see on their respective country's roster. Over 3 million votes to decide national teams were cast.

Qualification 
Throughout September 2016, fifty national teams entered to qualify for the Overwatch World Cup through best-of-three online qualifiers. Six teams automatically qualified for the group stages. In total, four teams from the Americas, six from Europe, and six from the Asia-Pacific qualified for the group stages of the World Cup.

Invitation (6)
 
 
 
 
 
 

American Qualifier (1)
 

Asia-Pacific (3)
 
 
 

European Qualifier (6)

Group stage 
The qualified teams were grouped into four different round-robin style groups, with the matches to be played in online. The top two teams in each group advanced to the knockout stage.

Group A

Group B

Group C

Group D

Tiebreakers

Knockout stage

Bracket

Awards

References

External links
Overwatch World Cup

Overwatch
Overwatch World Cup
Overwatch
Overwatch